Allen Rosenberg may refer to:

Allen Rosenberg (rowing) (1931–2013), American rowing coxswain and rowing coach
Al Rosenberg, writer/performer

See also
Allan Rosenberg (spy) (1909–1991), American accused of being a spy